It's Me...Gerald is a Canadian television sitcom, which aired on Showcase Television in 2005.

The show, based on the 2004 mockumentary film Gerald L'Ecuyer: A Filmmaker's Journey, stars Canadian actor and director Gerald L'Ecuyer as a fictionalized version of himself, in a format which somewhat resembles the American comedy series Curb Your Enthusiasm. L'Ecuyer, the character, is a struggling gay theatre director trying to stage a production of Hedda Gabler, who gets involved in various misadventures as he tries to find, through any means necessary, the money to finance his vision while a camera crew documents his efforts.

The cast also includes Beau Starr, Mark Day, Mary McLaughlin, Kristen Thomson and Tom McCamus. The series was created by writer-producers Gail Cook and John McLaughlin in conjunction with L'Ecuyer.

References

2000s Canadian LGBT-related comedy television series
2005 Canadian television series debuts
2005 Canadian television series endings
Showcase (Canadian TV channel) original programming
2000s Canadian sitcoms
Canadian LGBT-related sitcoms